Botanika is an indoor botanical garden with science center, in the Rhododendron-Park Bremen. The greenhouses opened in the year 2003 and show primarily azaleas and rhododendrons.

Greenhouses and Discovery Centre 
The four major greenhouses are divided into the regions of Japan, Borneo, the Himalayas, as well as a tropical butterfly house. The facilities presents several asiatic landscapes, along with native animals such as lar gibbons, common hill mynas or kois. Smaller greenhouses show special exhibitions, which change every few months.    
Since August 2017, the greenhouses are home to the 2.4 meter tall "Buddha for Europe", a gift by the 14th Dalai Lama as a symbol for world peace.

The "Discovery Centre" is a two stories tall interactive science centre. It contains over 80 different exhibits about plants and animals, various terrariums as well as a reef aquarium.

Gallery

References 

Natural history museums in Germany
Botanical gardens in Germany
Museums in Bremen (city)